Legendary is the third studio album by rock band The Summer Set.

In February 2013, the band supported All Time Low on their tour of the UK. In February and March, the band went on a headlining US tour, dubbed Wake Up & Be Awesome Tour, with support from We Are the In Crowd, Go Radio, For the Foxes and Paradise Fears. Legendary was released on April 16, 2013. In June 2015, the group supported Sleeping with Sirens on their acoustic tour, dubbed the We Like It Quiet Tour.

Reception

The album peaked at number 53 on the US Billboard 200 chart. The album also landed the number 12 spot on the Billboard Independent Albums chart.

Track listing

Charts

References

External links

Legendary at YouTube (streamed copy where licensed)

The Summer Set albums
2013 albums
Fearless Records albums